Ethan Gage (born May 8, 1991) is a  Canadian soccer player who currently plays for Victorian State League Division 1 side Caroline Springs George Cross FC.

Club career

Youth
Born in Cochrane, Alberta, Gage won a gold medal with Alberta at the 2007 BMO Financial Group U16 Boys National All-Star Championship and won a gold medal with the Calgary Elbow Valley Villains at the 2007 BMO National Championships U-16 adidas Cup Boys Club Championship in Sherwood Park, Alberta.

Professional
Gage was a member of the Vancouver Whitecaps Residency team which won the 2008 USL Premier Development League Southwest Division title in 2008. On August 15, 2008, following the conclusion of the 2008 PDL season, he was called up to the senior Vancouver Whitecaps squad.

On January 31, 2011, Gage signed with Reading in the English Football League Championship.

After being released by Reading, Gage signed for Swedish Division 2 Södra Svealand side Nyköping.

Gage joined Norwegian side Bærum SK on January 22, 2015.

Moving to Australia in early 2018, Gage initially joined Victorian State League Division 2 North-West side Corio SC, before moving up three divisions to join National Premier Leagues Victoria side Bentleigh Greens SC in the mid-season transfer window.

After an impressive first season in Australia, Gage signed for rival club NPL club South Melbourne for the 2019 season. Gage was released in the mid-season transfer window, subsequently moving to Victorian State League Division 1 side Caroline Springs George Cross FC.

International career
Gage was a part of the Canada U-16 camps in 2007, and has Gage has also captained the Canada men's national soccer team at the U-17 and U-20 levels.

Gage was awarded in December 2010 the Canadian men's U-20 Player of the Year for the first time, Nana Attakora had won the award the previous two years.

Honors

Vancouver Whitecaps
USL First Division Championship: 2008

Individual
Canadian U-20 Player of the Year: 2010

Club statistics

Updated: March 10, 2015.

References

External links
Vancouver Whitecaps bio

1991 births
Living people
People from Cochrane, Alberta
Canadian soccer players
Soccer people from Alberta
Canadian expatriate soccer players
Vancouver Whitecaps Residency players
Vancouver Whitecaps (1986–2010) players
Reading F.C. players
Bærum SK players
Norwegian First Division players
USL League Two players
USL First Division players
USSF Division 2 Professional League players
Canada men's youth international soccer players
Canadian expatriate sportspeople in Norway
Canadian expatriate sportspeople in Sweden
Association football midfielders
Canadian expatriate sportspeople in England
National Premier Leagues players
2009 CONCACAF U-20 Championship players
Caroline Springs George Cross FC players